Lviv State Academic male choir "Dudaryk" is a Ukrainian choir founded October 17, 1971 by the Ukrainian music and choir society. The choir is a Shevchenko National Prize laureate.

History 
The founder and chief conductor of the choir was Honored Artist of Ukraine - Mykola Katsal. He was born on December 10, 1940 in Grechany, Podillia. Katsal graduated from Lviv Polytechnic Institute (geodesy), Music College and Conservatory.

In 1977, 6 years after the founding, Dudaryk was already among the finalists at the festival of art groups in the Soviet Union. As an amateur the group existed until 1989. Thanks to the efforts of Mykola Katsal and his colleagues Lubov Katsal and Lesia Chaikivska, in 1989 the first boys choir school in Ukraine - "Dudaryk" was established. 

In 2020 President of Ukraine Volodymyr Zelensky granted national status to the choir.

Since its founding Dudaryk gave over 1500 concerts in prestigious concert halls and churches of Ukraine and worldwide, including Carnegie Hall - U.S., Duomo - Lithuania, Notre Dame de Paris - France, Vancouver-Pacific International festival Canada Place and many others.

Awards 

 The honorary title "People's Choir" (1977).
 Diploma of the Supreme Soviet of Ukraine (1987).
 Shevchenko National Prize, (1989) ( the only youth art group in Ukraine).
 Honorary title State Choir (2000). 
 Honorary title State Academic Choir (2010).

Festivals 
 1978, 1981, 1987, 1991 - member of international choral festivals in Estonia and Latvia
 1987, 1989 - member of international choral festivals in Hungary
 1990 - 57 concerts in U.S. and Canada
 1991 - 2003, participant of international festivals in Poland, Switzerland, France and Belgium

External links 

 Official webpage

References

Ukrainian choirs
Musical groups established in 1971
Institutions with the title of National in Ukraine